Michael Henry Hicks Beach, 3rd Earl St Aldwyn (born 7 February 1950) is a British peer, baronet, and businessman. He was a member of the House of Lords from 1992 to 1999.

The eldest of the three sons of Michael Hicks Beach, 2nd Earl St Aldwyn, and his wife Diana Mary Christian Mills, he was educated at Eton College and Christ Church, Oxford.
Since 1994 he has been managing director of International Fund Marketing (UK) Ltd.

In 1982, he married firstly Gilda Maria, daughter of João Adolfo Pinto da Cunha Saavedra, of Rio de Janeiro. In 2005 he married secondly Mrs Louise Wigan,  Mostyn. With his first wife he has two daughters

Lady Atalanta Maria Hicks-Beach (born 1983)
Lady Aurora Ursula Hicks-Beach (born 1988)

The heir presumptive to the peerages is St Aldwyn’s younger brother David Seymour Hicks-Beach (born 1955), who was Page of Honour to Queen Elizabeth II between 1969 and 1972 and is now the owner of The Bones Dogalogue, a mail order firm for dogs. In 1993 he married Katrina Louise Susannah Henriques and has a daughter and a son.

Notes

1950 births
Alumni of Christ Church, Oxford
3
Michael 3
Living people
People educated at Eton College
St Aldwyn